Phaeophyscia is a genus of lichen-forming fungi in the family Physciaceae.

Species

Phaeophyscia adiastola 
Phaeophyscia cernohorskyi 
Phaeophyscia ciliata 
Phaeophyscia confusa 
Phaeophyscia constipata 
Phaeophyscia crocea 
Phaeophyscia culbersonii 
Phaeophyscia dagestanica 
Phaeophyscia decolor 
Phaeophyscia denigrata 
Phaeophyscia echinata 
Phaeophyscia endoaurantiaca 
Phaeophyscia endococcina 
Phaeophyscia endococcinodes 
Phaeophyscia endophoenicea 
Phaeophyscia erythrocardia 
Phaeophyscia esslingeri 
Phaeophyscia exornatula 
Phaeophyscia fumosa 
Phaeophyscia hirsuta 
Phaeophyscia hirtella 
Phaeophyscia hirtuosa 
Phaeophyscia hispidula 
Phaeophyscia hunana 
Phaeophyscia imbricata 
Phaeophyscia insignis 
Phaeophyscia kairamoi 
Phaeophyscia kashmirensis
Phaeophyscia laciniata 
Phaeophyscia latifolia 
Phaeophyscia leana 
Phaeophyscia limbata 
Phaeophyscia lygaea 
Phaeophyscia melanchra 
Phaeophyscia microspora 
Phaeophyscia nadvornikii 
Phaeophyscia nashii 
Phaeophyscia nepalensis 
Phaeophyscia nigricans 
Phaeophyscia opuntiella 
Phaeophyscia orbicularis 
Phaeophyscia primaria 
Phaeophyscia pusilloides 
Phaeophyscia pyrrhophora 
Phaeophyscia rubropulchra 
Phaeophyscia saxatilis 
Phaeophyscia sciastra 
Phaeophyscia sonorae 
Phaeophyscia spinellosa 
Phaeophyscia squarrosa 
Phaeophyscia stiriaca 
Phaeophyscia strigosa 
Phaeophyscia sulphurascens 
Phaeophyscia ticinensis 
Phaeophyscia trichophora

References

Caliciales
Lichen genera
Caliciales genera
Taxa described in 1977